The men's 3 × 1000 metres relay event at the 1967 European Indoor Games was held on 12 March in Prague. It was the first time that this event was held at the championships.

Results

References

4 × 400 metres relay at the European Athletics Indoor Championships
Relay